Uptown Mall is a lifestyle mall in Taguig City, located at the northern part of Fort Bonifacio. It is located along 9th and 11th avenue, 36th and 11th drive, in Fort Bonifacio, Taguig City. It hosts a variety of lifestyle, retail, leisure and entertainment venues from locally sourced brands to international establishments.

This multi purpose mall is the focal point of Uptown Bonifacio Township community.  There are many home town style options for office buildings, and the headquarters of Alliance Global Group, Inc. The parent company of Megaworld inc.  Uptown Mall is directly proportional to three high-end residential condominiums 

One Uptown Residence, Uptown Ritz and Uptown Parksuites.

Features
The mall serves as a podium of the four-tower Uptown Corporate Center office towers, anchored by Pru Life UK and other support/services tenants. The mall has five levels, including a lower ground level and six basement parking levels, starting from the Lower Ground Level (or Basement 1) to Basement 6. 

Uptown Mall has a wide array of high-fashion shops such as H&M, Uniqlo, Base London, Adidas Originals, Adidas NJE, Daniel Wellington, @Tokyo, Mercer Street and many more. The mall also has stores catering to different market segment and lifestyle including Rustan's Supermarket, True Value, National Bookstore, Toys R Us, as well as furniture and home improvement stores.

For dining, Uptown Mall also offers a varied roster of restaurants, made up mostly of fresh homegrown concepts and foreign dining brands. These include names such as Hello Kitty Café, Tim Hortons, Tim Ho Wan, Menya Kokoro, Olivia & Co., Texas Roadhouse, Ippudo, Sentro 1771 and many more. The mall also sports a modern Food Hall that houses a wide selection of dining establishments offering quick and affordable food choices for employees in the township.

For entertainment, Uptown Mall offers five theatres, 2 with Dolby Atmos technology, and an Ultra Cinema with fully reclining Lazy Boy seats. Uptown Cinemas is also home to Boozy Bar, the country's first cinema cocktail bar where movie goers can order a variety of drinks and finger-food, and have them delivered right to their seats.

The mall also features an open-air area at the fourth level called The Deck, which is home to the St. Gabriel the Archangel Chapel and restaurants offering alfresco dining. Uptown Mall also has its own VIP Lounge where mall guests can relax after and enjoy free drinks and use of WiFi.  At the ground floor of the mall is the Fire and Water Fountain, a Las Vegas-inspired water feature.

Uptown Parade
Uptown Parade is a two-level commercial strip across Uptown Mall. This  mall is primarily a dining hub with a mix of specialty restaurants serving international cuisine such as Salvatore Cuomo, Pizza Studio, Cafe Barbera, Namoo House, Char, Sweet Ecstasy, Wow Cow and Gorda, among others.

Uptown Parade is also a popular nightlife destination in the Philippines and is home to the Palace Manila, which hosts a collection of upscale bars and nightclubs such as Xylo, The Island The Brewery, B.A.D., Yes, Please!, and Revel.

Gallery

References

External links

 

Shopping malls in Taguig
Bonifacio Global City
Shopping malls established in 2015